The Nippon Budokan, often called the Budokan for short, is a historic arena in central Tokyo, Japan.

Budokan may also refer to:

Akita Prefectural Budokan, an arena in Akita, Japan
Budokan karate, a style of martial arts created in 1966 by Chew Choo Soot
Budokan: The Martial Spirit, a 1989 computer game by Electronic Arts